The following is a list of compilation albums of songs recorded by U.S. singer Jo Stafford that were released between 1955 and 1999. They include material from her solo career, and recordings she made with artists such as Gordon MacRae, as well as her foray into comedy with husband Paul Weston as New Jersey lounge act Jonathan and Darlene Edwards.

The Voice of Your Choice

The Voice of Your Choice is a 1955 compilation album by Jo Stafford released by Philips Records.

Sweet Singer of Songs

Sweet Singer of Songs is a compilation album by Jo Stafford on Vocalion/Decca Records released in 1969.

Big Band Sound

Big Band Sound is a 1970 compilation album of standards by Jo Stafford. The songs were recorded between 1960 and 1970 and see Stafford backed by a number of big band arrangers, notably her husband Paul Weston, as well as Billy May and Benny Carter. The album was released on the Corinthian label.

In the Mood for Love

In the Mood for Love is a 1970 compilation album of songs by Jo Stafford. It was released in 1970 by Vocalion Records.

Jo Stafford: By Request

Jo Stafford: By Request is a 1982 compilation album of recordings by Jo Stafford .

Broadway Revisited

Broadway Revisited is a 1987 compilation album of recordings by Jo Stafford.

{| class="wikitable collapsible collapsed" style="width:300px;"
|-
!Track listing
|-
|1 My Romance
|-
|2 Something to Remember You By
|-
|3 It Never Entered My Mind'
|-
|4  They Say It's Wonderful|-
|5  I'm Always Chasing Rainbows|-
|6  Make the Man Love Me|-
|7  Happiness is a Thing Called Joe|-
|8  Dancing in the Dark|-
|9  September Song|-
|10 Spring Is Here|-
|11 If I Were a Bell|-
|12 Mountain High, Valley Low|-
|13 How High the Moon|-
|14 I'm Your Girl|-
|15 Night and Day|}

G.I. JoG.I. Jo is a 1987 compilation album of recordings by Jo Stafford.
{| class="wikitable collapsible collapsed" style="width:300px;"
|-
!Track listing
|-
|1  I'll Walk Alone|-
|2  I Left My Heart at the Stage Door Canteen|-
|3 No Love, No Nothin|-
|4 We Mustn't Say Goodbye
|-
|5 You'll Never Know
|-
|5 I'll Remember April
|-
|6 It Could Happen to You
|-
|7  I Don't Want to Walk Without You
|-
|8 I Fall in Love Too Easily
|-
|9 I'll Be Seeing You
|}

Introducing Jo StaffordIntroducing Jo Stafford is a compilation album by Jo Stafford featuring Paul Weston, The Starlighters, and The Pied Pipers on Capitol Records released in 1987.

{| class="wikitable collapsible collapsed" style="width:300px;"
|-
!Track listing
|-
|1 Begin the Beguine
|-
|2 Roses of Picardy
|-
|3 If I Ever Love Again
|-
|4 Congratulations
|-
|5  Why Can't You Behave?
|-
|6 Sometime
|-
|7 Always True to You in My Fashion
|-
|8  Scarlet Ribbons
|-
|9  Too Marvelous for Words
|-
|10 Over the Rainbow
|-
|11 Just Reminiscin|-
|12 Walkin' My Baby Back Home
|-
|13 I Remember You
|-
|14 Happy Times|-
|15 Baby Won't You Please Come Home|-
|16 Smoke Dreams|}

You Belong to MeYou Belong to Me is a 1989 compilation album of recordings by Jo Stafford.

America's Most Versatile Singing Star

America's Most Versatile Singing Star is a 1990 compilation album of recordings by Jo Stafford.

Fabulous Song Stylists

Fabulous Song Stylists is a 1991 compilation album of recordings by Jo Stafford. The album was released on the Sony label and sees Stafford backed by Les Brown and his band.

Capitol Collectors Series

Capitol Collectors Series is a compilation album of songs by Jo Stafford. It was released on the Capitol Records label on March 18, 1991, and is a collection of her best known hits during the 1940s.

Greatest Hits

Greatest Hits is a 1993 compilation album of songs recorded by Jo Stafford, issued by Curb Records as catalog number 77619 and by Corinthian Records as catalog number 106.

Jonathan and Darlene's Greatest Hits

Jonathan and Darlene's Greatest Hits is a 1993 compilation album of songs by Paul Weston and Jo Stafford recarded in the guise of Jonathan and Darlene Edwards, a New Jersey lounge act who performed deliberately off-key, putting their own interpretation on popular songs. The album was released by Corinthian Records on September 11, 1993.

Jonathan and Darlene's Greatest Hits: Volume 2

Jonathan and Darlene's Greatest Hits: Volume 2 is a 1994 compilation album of songs by Paul Weston and Jo Stafford recarded in the guise of Jonathan and Darlene Edwards, a New Jersey lounge act who performed deliberately off-key, putting their own interpretation on popular songs. The album was released by Corinthian Records on February 22, 1993.

The Duets

The Duets is a 1994 compilation of recordings by Jo Stafford and Frankie Laine. The album was released on the Bear Family label on June 28, 1994, and has 20 tracks.

Portrait Edition

Portrait Edition is a three disc box set compilation album released by Sony Entertainment and featuring songs recorded by American singer Jo Stafford. The album was released by Sony on August 30, 1994.

16 Most Requested Songs

16 Most Requested Songs is a 1995 compilation album of songs recorded by American female singer Jo Stafford.

For You

For You is a 1995 compilation album of songs recorded by American singer Jo Stafford. It was released on the Memoir label on December 12, 1995.

Spotlight on Jo Stafford

Spotlight on Jo Stafford is a 1996 compilation album of songs recorded by American singer Jo Stafford. It was released on January 23, 1996, and appears on both the Capitol and EMI labels.

Drifting and Dreaming with Jo Stafford

Drifting and Dreaming with Jo Stafford is a 1996 compilation album of songs recorded by American singer Jo Stafford. It was released on July 9, 1996 on the Jazz Classics label.

The Jo Stafford Story

The Jo Stafford Story is a 1997 compilation album of songs recorded by American singer Jo Stafford. The album was released by Jasmine Records on April 1, 1997.

The One & Only

The One & Only is a 1997 compilation album of songs recorded by American singer Jo Stafford. It was released by EMI Records on August 26, 1997.

Walkin' My Baby Back Home

Walkin' My Baby Back Home is a 1998 compilation album of songs recorded by American singer Jo Stafford. The album was released by See For Miles Records on January 1, 1998.

G.I. Jo Sings the Hits

G.I. Jo Sings the Hits is a 1998 compilation album of songs recorded by American singer Jo Stafford. The album was released on the Prism Platinum label on January 27, 1998.

Too Marvelous for Words

Too Marvelous for Words is a 1998 compilation album of songs recorded by American singer Jo Stafford. It was released on the Memoir label on February 10, 1998.

Coming Back Like a Song: 25 Hits 1941-47

Coming Back Like a Song: 25 Hits 1941–47 is a 1998 compilation album of songs recorded by American singer Jo Stafford. The album was released by ASV on May 19, 1998.

No Other Love

No Other Love is a 1998 compilation album of songs recorded by American singer Jo Stafford. The album was released on The Entertainers label on August 4, 1998.

1940-1944

1940-1944 is a 1998 compilation album of songs recorded by Jo Stafford. The songs are from the early part of her career, recorded during the Second World War. The album was released on The Entertainers label on August 4, 1998.

V-Disc Recordings, Jo Stafford

The V-Disc program began in June 1941 and continued until May 1949.  It was a way for United States service people stationed overseas to have access to the music that was currently popular "at home". Musicians and recording artists made these special recordings strictly for those serving in the Armed Forces.  Jo Stafford produced 20 V-Discs for the entertainment of those in the military during this time; this album is a compilation of the V-Disc recordings she made.

Happy Holidays: I Love the Winter Weather

Happy Holidays: I Love the Winter Weather is a 1999 compilation of seasonal songs recorded by American singer Jo Stafford. It was released by Corinthian Records, the label founded by Stafford and her husband, Paul Weston on October 12, 1999.

References 

 1955-1999
Stafford compilations 1955-1999
Stafford 1955